Two in the Wave is a 2010 French documentary film directed by Emmanuel Laurent. The film depicts the friendship between French directors François Truffaut and Jean-Luc Godard.

Synopsis
The film investigates the fruitful and turbulent relationship between the two influential French New Wave directors. The film focuses the success of The 400 Blows and Breathless, the role of Jean-Pierre Léaud in both Truffaut and Godard's films, and the directors' fascination with American film. Two in the Wave ends with the 1973 incident between Godard and Truffaut; Godard wrote a letter to Truffaut criticizing his Oscar-winning film Day for Night. Truffaut responded to the attack by writing a 20-page letter to Godard.
The film is narrated by Antoine de Baecque, Truffaut biographer and former Cahiers du Cinéma editor.

Reception
The film have received mixed to positive reviews from critics.

It has earned a 66% rating on Rotten Tomatoes.

It was released on DVD by Kino Lorber on February 22, 2011.

See also
Hitchcock/Truffaut - the 2015 documentary film based on the book of the same name
Auteurism
Andrew Sarris and Pauline Kael-two American film critics who also have turbulent feuds about cinema

References

External links
 
Official trailer
Review on The Guardian

2010 films
2010s French-language films
French documentary films
Documentary films about film directors and producers
2010 documentary films
2010s French films